John Joseph Sarna (March 9, 1935 – April 20, 2021) was an American politician in the state of Minnesota. He served in the Minnesota House of Representatives from 1972 to 1996 and was a Democrat. Sarna was born in Minneapolis, Minnesota and was involved with the United Auto Workers.

References

1935 births
2021 deaths
Politicians from Minneapolis
United Auto Workers people
Democratic Party members of the Minnesota House of Representatives